Fábio Ilídio Furtado Gomes (born 21 September 1988) is a Portuguese footballer of Cape Verdean descent who plays as a forward.

Football career
On 27 July 2014, Gomes made his professional debut with Farense in a 2014–15 Taça da Liga match against Chaves.

References

External links

Stats and profile at LPFP 

1988 births
Footballers from Lisbon
Portuguese sportspeople of Cape Verdean descent
Living people
Portuguese footballers
Portuguese expatriate footballers
Association football forwards
GD Bragança players
S.C. Farense players
Liga Portugal 2 players
C.R. Caála players
Girabola players
F.C. Vizela players
Sertanense F.C. players
Portuguese expatriate sportspeople in Angola
Expatriate footballers in Angola